Ende may refer to the following languages:

Ende language (Indonesia), an Austronesian language of Flores Island, Indonesia
 Ende language (Sulawesi), an Austronesian language of Sulawesi, Indonesia
Ende language (Papua New Guinea), a Papuan language of Papua New Guinea

See also 
 Ande language, an Austronesian language of Vanuatu